The flûte d'amour (translates as: Love Flute) is an uncommon member of the Western concert flute family, pitched in A, A, or B and is intermediate in size between the modern C concert flute and the alto flute in G. It is sometimes thought of as the mezzo-soprano member of the flute family. It is also sometimes called a tenor flute.

It is  longer than the concert flute and plays either a major second, minor third, or major third below the standard C flute. A number of these instruments have survived. Apart from their length, they do not differ in any way from the concert flute; the bore diameter and embouchure are identical.

"When Verdi composed the opera Aida for performance in Cairo in 1871, he conceived the 'Sacred Egyptian Dance,' the finale of Act I, as being played by a group of three flûtes ď amour, and three such flutes were especially constructed in Milan. ... In present-day performances of this opera, the music for the flûtes ďamour is usually assigned to other instruments."

Flute d' amour repertoire

References

Further reading
 Montagu, Jeremy, Howard Mayer Brown, Jaap Frank, and Ardal Powell. 2001. "Flute, II: The Western Transverse Flute, 3. Other Members of the Family, (iii) Flûte d’amour". The New Grove Dictionary of Music and Musicians, second edition, edited by Stanley Sadie and John Tyrrell. London: Macmillan Publishers.

Side-blown flutes